Nexus International School Malaysia established in 2008, Nexus International School is a private international school, with boarding facilities that is based in Putrajaya, Malaysia. It is part of the Taylor's Education Group. The education levels consists of Early Years, Primary, Secondary, and Pre-university.

The Early Years in Nexus is open for learners from nursery to reception level, where the International Early Years Curriculum (IEYC) is the choice of programme. For Primary level, the school incorporates the International Primary Curriculum (IPC) catered for Year 1 to Year 6 students. For Secondary level, the school offers the Middle School Programme for Year 7-9, the International General Certificate of Secondary Education (IGCSE) for Year 10-11. Lastly, in pre-university, the International Baccalaureate Diploma Programme (IB) is offered for Year 12-13.

The school's vision and philosophy revolves around the four teaching principles of The Nexus Way: Mindsets, Innovation, Inclusion, and Relationships.

In 2014, the school was appointed to deliver the international youth achievement award named The Duke of Edinburgh's International Award. Nexus is also a member of the Australian Boarding Schools' Association (ABSA), Boarding Schools' Association (BSA), Council of International Schools (CIS), and College Board.

Leadership team
The principal of Nexus International School Malaysia is Mr. David Griffiths. The senior leadership team consists of Head of Primary Ms. Kerry Legg, Head of Secondary Ms. Morag McCrorie, and Director of Boarding, Ms. Sandie Fowler.

Accreditations
Nexus is authorised and accredited by the following institutions and associations:
Apple Distinguished School
International Primary School at Mastering Level 
Council of International Schools 
International Baccalaureate
Boarding Schools’ Association
Australian Boarding Schools’ Association
Cambridge International Examinations
College Board

Curriculum
The Nexus curriculum aims to foster interdisciplinary learning across subjects, provide opportunity to explore student’s interests and cultivate their unique strengths.

Early years
The early years (EY) are divided into two age groups, 3 to 4 years old and 4 to 5 years old. Led by a fully qualified teacher and an experienced Learning Assistant, all EY classes focus on the process of exploring and learning through practical, first-hand experiences. The development of early reading, writing and number skills are provided here as well.

Primary
The primary school is catered for students from Year 1 to Year 6. The primary curriculum features the International Primary Curriculum (IPC) and the British National Curriculum standards for Maths.

The IPC is recognised as a comprehensive, thematic, and creative curriculum that emphasises on learning process and goals for every subject. The school was awarded the Mastering Status for its delivery of the IPC.

Secondary
The secondary School is catered for students from Year 7 to Year 11. The secondary curriculum is formulated as a preparation for the International General Certificates of Secondary Education (IGCSE).

Pre-university
Upon the completion of IGCSE, Year 12 and Year 13 students will study the International Baccalaureate Diploma Programme (IBDP) as part of their pre-university preparation. The core of this two-year educational programme covers The Extended Essay; Creative, Action and Service; and Theory of Knowledge. It is an internationally accepted qualification for entry into higher education, and is accepted by many universities worldwide.

Co-curricular activities
The co-curricular activities (CCA) in Nexus are designed to broaden personal ideals and encourage skill development for every student.

The CCA is sectioned into traditional team sports, individual sports, and arts and crafts projects. The program includes football, basketball, rock climbing, Taekwondo, archery, wakeboarding, clay making, and knitting classes.

The school is equipped with facilities such as an auditorium, sports halls and fields, music, art, TV, drama workshops and swimming pool.

Performing arts
Nexus organises a range of performing arts programs that encourage the development of creative talents and arts expressions in every student. It also helps students to explore new ideas, discover their passion, and express through music, art, drama and film.

The school’s Performing Arts Department is furnished with a fully equipped theatre, three specialist music classrooms, a drama studio, a recording studio, a film/media classroom with cinema and green screen, seven instrumental teaching rooms, a multimedia editing suite, and a dance studio with full-length wall mirrors.

Sports
The school’s sporting program and activities are designed to motivate individual empowerment and build a healthy Nexus community through quality physical education. It also supports the development of social skills, self-esteem, academic, and cognitive development. Regardless of their aptitude and ability, sports participation are available for students from Early Years through to Year 13 IB Learners.

Campus and facilities
Nexus is an international school that consists of classrooms, labs, and administrative buildings. The on-campus facilities include a swimming pool, tennis courts, football field, indoor gym cum multi-purpose hall, fully equipped auditorium, two-tiered library, and boarding facilities. It also has a cafeteria, dining room, drama and dance studio, classrooms, sports field, indoor gymnasium, multi-purpose, café, play area, rock wall, music room, sound and film studio.

Nexus Boarding House
Nexus Boarding House is an international standard boarding facility catered for learners between the ages of 10 and 18. It provides learners with an opportunity to develop their life skills and experiences after school hours. Led by the director of boarding, the boarders’ experience goes beyond having a place to stay. It includes routine activities, after-school activities, weekend activities and peer-to-peer camaraderie.

References

External links
 Nexus International School Malaysia website
 ExpatGo website
 The Duke of Edinburgh's International Award
 Boarding Schools' Association
 IB World School
 Sataban
 Ground breaking for Nexus school
 Optimal learning
 

International schools in Malaysia
Cambridge schools in Malaysia
Schools in Putrajaya
International Baccalaureate schools in Malaysia
Educational institutions established in 2008
2008 establishments in Malaysia